Siavonga District is a district of Zambia, located in Southern Province. The capital lies at Siavonga. As of the 2000 Zambian Census, the district had a population of 58,864 people. It is separated from Zimbabwe by Lake Kariba.

References

 
Districts of Southern Province, Zambia